Earle Hyman (born George Earle Plummer; October 11, 1926 – November 17, 2017) was an American stage, television, and film actor. Hyman is known for his role on ThunderCats as the voice of Panthro and various other characters. He also appeared on The Cosby Show as Cliff's father, Russell Huxtable. Singer Phyllis Hyman was his cousin.

Life and career
Hyman was born in Rocky Mount, North Carolina, as George Earle Plummer according to the North Carolina Birth Index. He claimed Native American ancestry. His parents, Zachariah Hyman and Maria Lilly Plummer seeking better educational opportunities, moved their family from the south  to Brooklyn, New York in the late 1920s, where Hyman primarily grew up. Hyman knew at age 4 that he wanted to become an actor after performing a poem at a church play and was determined to become one after seeing a production of Norwegian playwright Henrik Ibsen's Ghosts."The first play I ever saw was a present from my parents on my 13th birthday — Nazimova in Ghosts at Brighton Beach on the subway circuit — and I just freaked out."

He studied acting at HB Studio in New York City. He made his Broadway stage debut as a teenager in 1943 in Run, Little Chillun, and later joined the American Negro Theater. The following year, Hyman began a two-year run playing the role of Rudolf on Broadway in Anna Lucasta, starring Hilda Simms in the title role. He was a member of the American Shakespeare Theatre beginning with its first season in 1955, and played the role of Othello in the 1957 season.

In December 1958 he came to London to play the leading role in Moon on a Rainbow Shawl, by Errol John, at the Royal Court.

In 1959 he again appeared in the West End, this time in the first London production of A Raisin In the Sun alongside Kim Hamilton. The show ran at the Adelphi Theatre and was directed again by Lloyd Richards. A life member of The Actors Studio, Hyman appeared throughout his career in productions in both the United States and Norway, where he also owned property. In 1965, he won a Theatre World Award and in 1988, he was awarded the St Olav's medal for his work in Norwegian theater.

In addition to his stage work, Hyman appeared in various television and film roles including adaptions of Macbeth (1968), Julius Caesar (1979), and Coriolanus (1979), and voiced Panthro on the animated television series ThunderCats (1985–1989). He played two roles (at different times) on television's The Edge of Night.

One of his most well known roles, that of Russell Huxtable in The Cosby Show, earned him an Emmy Award nomination in 1986. He played the father of lead character Cliff Huxtable, played by actor Bill Cosby, despite only being 11 years older than Cosby.

Death
Hyman died at age 91 on November 17, 2017, at the Lillian Booth Actors Home in Englewood, New Jersey.

In June 2020, the Folger Shakespeare Library, a private research library in Washington D.C., acquired Hyman's personal items and memorabilia to be displayed as the Earle Hyman Collection. In personal correspondences Hyman wrote that he and Rolf Sirnes (1926–2004), a Norwegian seaman, had lived together for fifty years. Hyman described their relationship as a passionate friendship and wrote that Sirnes was his partner.

Connections to Norway
In Norway, Hyman was seen as a friend of the country and had a cabin in Skånevik.

Earle Hyman learned to speak Norwegian through Sirnes, who was originally from Haugesund. In the 1990s, they lived in New York City.

Filmography

Awards and nominations

References

External links

Audio Interview (2008)

1926 births
2017 deaths
20th-century American male actors
21st-century American male actors
African-American male actors
American male stage actors
American male television actors
American male voice actors
American gay actors
LGBT people from New York (state)
LGBT African Americans
Male actors from North Carolina
American male Shakespearean actors
American expatriates in Norway
People from Rocky Mount, North Carolina
People from Brooklyn
Recipients of the St. Olav's Medal